William "Cannonball" Jackman (October 7, 1897 – September 9, 1972) was an American baseball pitcher in the Negro leagues. He played from 1925 to 1942 with several teams, including a spot on the otherwise all-white East Douglas team in Massachusetts's amateur Blackstone Valley League in 1929, a squad which also featured 18-year-old newcomer Hank Greenberg.

At age 55, Jackman received votes listing him on the 1952 Pittsburgh Courier player-voted poll of the Negro leagues' best players ever.

References

External links
 and Baseball-Reference Black Baseball stats and Seamheads
Negro League Baseball Players Association

1897 births
1972 deaths
Brooklyn Eagles players
Newark Eagles players
Baseball players from Texas
People from Edwards County, Texas
20th-century African-American sportspeople
Baseball pitchers